The Berrien County School District is a public school district in Berrien County, Georgia, United States, based in Nashville, Georgia. It serves the communities of West Berrien, Alapaha, Enigma, Nashville, and Ray City.

Schools
The Berrien County School District has two elementary schools, one middle school, and one high school.

Elementary schools 
 Berrien Elementary School
 Berrien Primary School

Middle school
 Berrien Middle School

High school
 Berrien High School
 Rebel Regiment - marching band from Berrien High School

References

External links
 

School districts in Georgia (U.S. state)
Education in Berrien County, Georgia